John Steele Gordon (born May 7, 1944) is an American writer who specializes in the history of business and finance.

Born and raised in New York City, he graduated from Vanderbilt University. After spending some time in publishing, he left to travel, driving from England to India and back and from New York to Tierra del Fuego, returning as far as Rio de Janeiro. His first book was a how-to book on how to do this type of overland traveling. After working in politics for a few years as a press secretary for two congressmen, he wrote his first book on financial history, The Scarlet Woman of Wall Street (1988), a history of Wall Street in the 1860s. His history of the national debt, Hamilton's Blessing, was published in 1997 (2nd edition, 2010). In 2004 he published a history of the American economy, An Empire of Wealth. He has also written on technological history, including A Thread Across the Ocean, the story of laying the Atlantic cable in the mid-19th century, and Washington's Monument, a history of the monument and obelisks in general. John Steele Gordon wrote the Business of America column for American Heritage for 15 years and The Long View column for Barron's for ten years. He currently writes a column on banking history for the ABA banking journal. His op-eds and book reviews appear frequently in the Wall Street Journal and elsewhere. In 2019, Mr. Gordon wrote on global warming from a skeptical point of view for Commentary.

Bibliography
 Overlanding: How to explore the world on four wheels (1975)
 The Scarlet Woman of Wall Street: Jay Gould, Jim Fisk, Cornelius Vanderbilt, the Erie Railway Wars, and the Birth of Wall Street (1990)
 Hamilton's Blessing: The Extraordinary Life and Times of Our National Debt (1997)
 The Great Game: The Emergence of Wall Street as a World Power (1999)
 The Business of America: Tales from the Marketplace American Enterprise from the Settling of New England to the Break up of AT&T (2001)
 A Thread Across the Ocean: The Heroic Story of the Transatlantic Cable (2003)
 An Empire of Wealth: An Epic History of American Economic Power (2009)
 Hamilton's Blessing: The Extraordinary Life and Times of Our National Debt: Revised Edition (2010)
 Washington's Monument: And the Fascinating History of the Obelisk (2016)

References

External links

Living people
1944 births
Writers from New York (state)
Environmental skepticism